Robert Eastham (born 1 February 1989 in Balclutha) is a New Zealand sport shooter. Eastham represented New Zealand at the 2008 Summer Olympics in Beijing, where he competed in the men's 50 m rifle prone. He finished only in fourteenth place by one point behind Russia's Artem Khadjibekov from the fifth attempt, for a total score of 594 targets.

Eastham studied earth science at Massey University before joining the New Zealand Police. He graduated police college in December 2013.

References

External links
 
 
 NBC 2008 Olympics profile

New Zealand male sport shooters
Living people
Olympic shooters of New Zealand
Shooters at the 2008 Summer Olympics
Sportspeople from Balclutha, New Zealand
1989 births
New Zealand police officers
20th-century New Zealand people
21st-century New Zealand people